Ljubnica ( or ) is a dispersed settlement in the Municipality of Vitanje in northeastern Slovenia. The area is part of the traditional region of Styria and is now included with the rest of the municipality in the Savinja Statistical Region.

References

External links
Ljubnica at Geopedia

Populated places in the Municipality of Vitanje